Christian Marie Marc Lacroix (born 16 May 1951) is a French fashion designer. The name may also refer to the company he founded.

Lacroix's designs combine luxury and insouciance. He prefers artisanal trades, fringe, bead, and embroidery. He's characterized by a strong sense of colour, and patterns mix.

Early life
Lacroix was born in Arles, Bouches-du-Rhône in southern France. At a young age he began sketching historical costumes and fashions. Lacroix graduated from secondary school in 1969 and moved to Montpellier, to study Art History at the University of Montpellier. In 1971, he enrolled at the Sorbonne in Paris. While working on a dissertation on dress in French 18th-century painting, Lacroix also pursued a program in museum studies at the École du Louvre. His aspiration during this time was to become a museum curator. It was during this time he met his future wife Françoise Rosenthiel, whom he married in 1974.

Christian Lacroix couture

In 1987, he opened his own haute couture house. He began putting out ready-to-wear in 1988 drawing inspiration from diverse cultures. Critics commented that he did not seem to understand the type of clothing the working woman needed. In 1989, Lacroix launched jewelry, handbags, shoes, glasses, scarves, and ties (along with ready-to-wear). In this same year, he opened boutiques within Paris, Arles, Aix-en-Provence, Toulouse, London, Geneva, and Japan.

With his background in historical costume and clothing, Lacroix soon made headlines with his opulent, fantasy creations, including the short puffball skirt ("le pouf"), rose prints, and low décolleté necklines. He referenced widely from other styles—from fashion history (the corset and the crinoline), from folklore, and from many parts of the world—and he mixed his references in a topsy-turvy manner. He favored the hot colors of the Mediterranean region, a hodgepodge of patterns, and experimental fabrics, sometimes handwoven in local workshops.

From 1987 to its purchase from LVMH by Falic Fashion Group in 2005, the fashion house had cumulative losses of more than €44 million.

In 2009, the fashion house, owned by duty-free retailer Falic Fashion Group, put the business into administration and laid off all but 12 workers. Lacroix's A/W 2009 Haute Couture was privately financed by Lacroix and each model was paid €50. "I didn't want to cry," said Lacroix "I want to continue, maybe in a different way, with a small atelier. What I really care about is the women who do this work" Lacroix said about his last Haute Couture collection. Throughout its history, it never turned a profit and reported a €10 million loss in 2008.

Diffusion lines

His collections during 1994 were based on old culture and folklore, as well as fables and the past. In 1995, he launched a towel line which contained a fashion and lifestyle side, which represent how the two intertwine ("two sides of the same coin").

In 1996, he launched a jeans line. He included past traditions from all around the world, continuing the line with even more on ethnic arts.

In 1997, the Art de la Table line was launched by him in partnership with Christofle. A licensing agreement was also reached in this year with Pronuptian in which he could launch his Christian Lacroix Marriage line.

In 1999, he launched his first line of floral perfume, and in 2000 he finished a line of novelty accessories which included semi-precious jewelry.

In 2001, Lacroix also launched a children's line and in 2002, he launched a perfume, Bazar, created by Bertrand Duchaufour, Jean-Claude Ellena and Emilie Copperman.

In 2004, Lacroix launched a lingerie for women line, as well as a menswear line.

He is known for his theatrical style which came from his work while in the theatre. This usually shows up with his use of colour in the collections he designs. Along with this, he is also known for his 'le pouf' dress (featuring the ball skirt)

He served as the Creative Director for the Italian fashion house Emilio Pucci from 2002 to 2005. He left on agreeable terms as he and the house believed that since he had other pursuits, it would be unfair to the house to not put in the energy required for future collections along with his other work.

Christian Lacroix has designed many dresses for Hollywood stars; among them, he is responsible for designing Christina Aguilera's wedding dress and in the 1990s was famed as being a favourite designer of Edina Monsoon in the UK sitcom Absolutely Fabulous (for which the house drew dubious credit).

He has also been the designer of the new uniform of Air France staff and crew in 2004 and pyjamas signed by him are handed out to passengers travelling on Air France First Class (L'Espace Premier).

Today, Lacroix has 60 points of sale within France (department stores included). Around the world, Lacroix has 1,000 total points of sale.

For Winter 2007, he partnered with Avon cosmetics to introduce a new fragrance exclusive to Avon called Christian Lacroix Rouge for women (plus body lotion and shower gel) and Christian Lacroix Noir for men (plus after shave lotion and shower gel). His Avon product line was expanded with the release of Christian Lacroix Absynthe in the Spring of 2009, Christian Lacroix Absynthe For Him in the autumn of 2009, Christian Lacroix Nuit in fall 2011 and Christian Lacroix Nuit For Him in winter 2011, Christian Lacroix Ambre for Her and Christian Lacroix Ambre for Him in winter 2014, Christian Lacroix Bijou for Her and Christian Lacroix Bijou for Him in fall 2015.

Christian Lacroix's costume designs for the opera, theatre, dance and music were displayed at the exhibition "Christian Lacroix Costumier" at the National Museum of Singapore from March to June 2009.

In 2011, he started collaborating with the Barcelona-based clothing brand Desigual.

In 2022, he realises the costumes for the Marc-Antoine Charpentier's opéra David et Jonathas, performed at the Château de Versailles, France.

Director of interior design work
Christian Lacroix has completed interior design work at several landmark hotels, including the Hotel Le Petit Moulin in Spring, 2005; the Hotel Bellechasse, right in the heart of Saint-Germain-des-Prés (Paris), in 2007 (a member of Small Luxury Hotels of the World); and in 2010 Le Notre Dame hotel just a step from the cathedral Notre-Dame-de-Paris, as well as Hotel l'Antoine near the Bastille area in Paris.

References

External links 

 Christian Lacroix Official site
 
 20 years of the House of Lacroix

1951 births
Living people
French brands
French fashion designers
French interior designers
Haute couture
High fashion brands
Luxury brands
People from Arles
Christian Lacroix
University of Montpellier alumni
École du Louvre alumni
University of Paris alumni
1980s fashion